Bella Donna is the debut solo studio album by American singer and songwriter Stevie Nicks. Released on July 27, 1981, the album reached number one on the US Billboard 200 in September of that year. Bella Donna was awarded platinum status by the Recording Industry Association of America (RIAA) on October 7, 1981, less than three months after its release, and in 1990 was certified quadruple-platinum for four million copies shipped. Bella Donna spent nearly three years on the Billboard 200, from July 1981 to June 1984.

The album spawned four hit singles during 1981 and 1982: the Tom Petty and the Heartbreakers-penned duet "Stop Draggin' My Heart Around" (#3), the Don Henley duet "Leather and Lace" (#6), her signature song "Edge of Seventeen" (#11) and country-tinged "After the Glitter Fades" (#32).

Bella Donna would mark the beginning of Nicks' trend of calling upon her many musician friends and connections to fully realize her sparse demo recordings. Along with friends Tom Petty and Don Henley, Nicks brought in session musician Waddy Wachtel, Bruce Springsteen's E-Street Band pianist Roy Bittan, and Stax session man Donald "Duck" Dunn of Booker T. & the MGs. The album marked the first recording featuring Nicks' backing vocalists, Sharon Celani and Lori Perry, who still record and tour with Nicks today.

The album was also included in the "Greatest of All Time Billboard 200 Albums" chart.

History
Nicks began work on Bella Donna in 1979, in between sessions for her third album as part of Fleetwood Mac, Tusk, released in October that year. Nicks recorded various demo versions of songs in early and mid-1980 but these recordings were not used on the album. Following the end of the Tusk tour on September 1, 1980, work with a full band of other musicians commenced under producer Jimmy Iovine.

Recording sessions continued until the spring of 1981 when the final songs for the album were completed: "Edge of Seventeen" and "Stop Draggin' My Heart Around". The 10-song, 42-minute album Bella Donna was released in the summer of 1981. Nicks wrote "Think About It" for her friend and Fleetwood Mac bandmate Christine McVie. A number of finished songs did not make it on the album, including "Blue Lamp", which was released instead on the Heavy Metal soundtrack later in 1981, and "Sleeping Angel", released on the Fast Times at Ridgemont High soundtrack in 1982. These two songs were included on Nicks' Enchanted boxed set in 1998, along with another unused Bella Donna session song, "Gold and Braid". Three more songs from these sessions, "If You Were My Love", "Belle Fleur" and "The Dealer", were finally released on Nicks' album 24 Karat Gold: Songs from the Vault (2014).

On her Enchanted boxed set release in 1998, remastered versions of some Bella Donna tracks ran noticeably longer in some instances, notably "Leather and Lace". Video footage of the album sessions can be found on the DVD portion of Nicks' retrospective release Crystal Visions – The Very Best of Stevie Nicks (2007).

Rhino released and expanded, three-disc version of Bella Donna on November 4, 2016. The first disc is the remastered original album. The second disc includes outtakes, alternative versions, demos and more. The third disc consists of live tracks from Nicks' "White Wing Dove" tour 1981, recorded at the Fox Wilshire Theatre in Los Angeles, California on December 13, 1981.

Track listing

(*) denotes previously unreleased

Personnel
Band
 Stevie Nicks – vocals, tack piano (track 9)
 Waddy Wachtel – guitar (tracks 1–2, 4–8)
 Davey Johnstone – acoustic guitar (tracks 1–2, 4–5, 7, 10)
 Bob Glaub – bass guitar (tracks 1–2, 4–7)
 Benmont Tench – organ (tracks 1–7, 9)
 Russ Kunkel – drums (tracks 1–2, 4–8)

Additional musicians
 Tom Petty –  rhythm guitar (tracks 3, 9), co-lead vocals (track 3)
 Mike Campbell – guitar (tracks 3, 9, 10)
 Don Felder – guitar (track 10)
 Don Henley – vocals, drums, backup vocals (tracks 8, 10)
 Stan Lynch – drums (tracks 3, 9)
 Donald Dunn – bass guitar (track 3)
 Tom Moncrieff – bass guitar (track 9)
 Richard Bowden – bass guitar (track 10)
 Dan Dugmore – pedal steel guitar (track 5)
 Bill Elliott – piano (track 1)
 Bobbye Hall – percussion (tracks 1–2, 4–7)
 Phil Jones – percussion (tracks 3, 9)
 Roy Bittan – piano (tracks 2, 5–8)
 Billy Payne – piano (track 4)
 David Adelstein – synthesizer (track 1)
 Lori Perry – backing vocals
 Sharon Celani – backing vocals

Tour Band (2016 Deluxe Edition Disc 3)
 Stevie Nicks
 Roy Bittan – piano
 Sharon Celani – backing vocals
 Bob Glaub – bass
 Bobbye Hall – percussion
 Russ Kunkel – drums
 Lori Perry – backing vocals
 Benmont Tench – keyboards & synthesizer
 Waddy Wachtel – lead guitar

Photography
 Herbert W. Worthington

Production
 Produced by Jimmy Iovine & Tom Petty
 Engineered and mixed by Shelly Yakus and Don Smith
 Assistant engineers: Dana Latham, Tori Swenson, Niko Bolas and James Ball
 Additional engineering by Thom Panunzio
 Mastered by Stephen Marcussen

Tour and HBO television special
Nicks underwent a short national tour in support of the album, starting on November 28, 1981, and finishing on December 13, 1981. The final night at The Wilshire Fox Theatre in Beverly Hills was recorded by HBO for a television special and later released on VHS and LaserDisc video in many territories by CBS/Fox in 1982 as White Wing Dove – Stevie Nicks in Concert. The whole show was recorded, but only 9 tracks ("Gold Dust Woman", "Gold And Braid", "I Need to Know", an edited "Outside the Rain", "Dreams", "Stop Draggin' My Heart Around", "Sara", "Edge of Seventeen" and "Rhiannon") were shown on the TV special and released to video.

However, the live performance of "Leather and Lace" was used as a video promo for the single release (even though it was a solo version and did not feature Don Henley), and did surface on the 1986 VHS collection I Can't Wait, which featured six of Nicks' promo-clips between 1981 and 1985. These six promos were released on DVD as a special feature to the Australian issue of Fleetwood Mac – Mirage Tour in 2007.

On the 2016 Bella Donna Deluxe Edition, 14 tracks from the show - the ten aforementioned songs as well as "Angel", "After the Glitter Fades", "Bella Donna" and "How Still My Love" - were remastered and released (Disc 3), with "Outside the Rain" being restored to its full version.  Previously, only two tracks ("Edge of Seventeen" and "Gold and Braid") were found on the boxset The Enchanted Works of Stevie Nicks (1998). "Blue Lamp" and "Think About It" were recorded and received audio broadcast on radio but were not televised, and as such have never been officially released.

Nicks' retrospective Crystal Visions – The Very Best of Stevie Nicks (2007) included the full live 1981 clip of "Edge of Seventeen" on the DVD supplement, with optional commentary from Nicks. She admits that her tears at the end of the song were due to her thoughts of having to join Fleetwood Mac in France the following day to begin recording the album Mirage, one of the key reasons why the 1981 tour was so short.

The White Wing Dove performance remains unreleased in its entirety, although it has been circulating for many years amongst fans as a bootleg.

Tour set list
"Gold Dust Woman"
"Think About It"
"Outside the Rain"
"Dreams"
"Angel"
"After the Glitter Fades"
"Gold and Braid"
"I Need to Know" (Tom Petty and the Heartbreakers cover)
"Sara"
"Bella Donna"
"Blue Lamp"
"Leather and Lace"
"How Still My Love"
"Stop Draggin' My Heart Around"
"Edge of Seventeen"
"Rhiannon" (encore)

Tour dates
 November 28 – Houston, Texas, The Summit Arena
 November 29 – Dallas, Texas, Reunion Arena
 December 1 - Boulder, Colorado, Colorado University Events Center
 December 3 – Oakland, California, Oakland Coliseum
 December 5 – Tempe, Arizona, Compton Terrace
 December 6 – Los Angeles, California, Wilshire Fox Theater
 December 7 – Los Angeles, California, Wilshire Fox Theater
 December 8 – Los Angeles, California, Wilshire Fox Theater
 December 12 – Los Angeles, California, Wilshire Fox Theater
 December 13 – Los Angeles, California, Wilshire Fox Theater

Charts

Weekly charts

Year-end charts

Certifications and sales

References

Bibliography

 

1981 debut albums
Stevie Nicks albums
Albums produced by Jimmy Iovine
Albums produced by Tom Petty
Atco Records albums
Modern Records (1980) albums